The Liberty of Durham was a regional division of the North of England under the control of the Bishop of Durham.

The liberty was known variously as the "Liberty of Durham", "Liberty of St Cuthbert's Land", "The lands of St. Cuthbert between Tyne and Tees" or "The Liberty of Haliwerfolc", the latter translates to "district of the holy saint's folk". St. Cuthbert gained a reputation as being fiercely protective of his domain.

The bishops' special jurisdiction was based on claims that King Ecgfrith of Northumbria had granted a substantial territory to St Cuthbert on his election to the see of Lindisfarne in 684. In about 883, a cathedral housing the saint's remains was established at Chester-le-Street and Guthfrith, King of York granted the community of St Cuthbert the area between the Tyne and the Wear. In 995 the see was moved again to Durham.

In the 1293 it became the County Palatine of Durham, and from the 13th century onwards the bishops frequently claimed the same rights in their lands as the king enjoyed in his kingdom.

References

History of County Durham
Durham